The Warren County Courthouse is a stone building constructed in 1908 in Williamsport, Indiana.  It was added to the National Register of Historic Places on March 19, 2008.

History 
At the first Warren County seat of Warrenton, a log house owned (and occupied) by Enoch Farmer was used for general court and county purposes. When the county seat was moved to Williamsport, a log house belonging to the town's proprietor, William Harrison, served as the courthouse starting in July 1829. In 1832, plans were made for a new building, and in July of that year the construction bid was won by E. W. Jones and Seth Flowers. The cost of construction was about $2000. In 1835 the building was strengthened and improved.

In 1870 a specially-appointed committee determined that the old building was unsafe, and plans were begun to replace it; but opposition to the plan delayed progress until early 1871.  The plans called for a new brick building to be constructed in what is now known as "Old Town", the original portion of Williamsport that was on the shores of the Wabash River.  The firm of Hays and Evans of Bloomington, Illinois was awarded the job with a bid of $48,400.  The county did not have sufficient funds for the project, so $10,000 worth of county bonds were issued.  The new courthouse was accepted in December 1872.

In 1886 it was torn down and rebuilt as the third courthouse on the current site, in the newer portion of town that had developed because of the railroad.  This courthouse had a 155-foot tower.  Early on the morning of Sunday, January 20, 1907, the building caught fire and was largely destroyed, though most of the records were saved.

The current courthouse was designed by J. W. Royer of Urbana, Illinois and was constructed by Frank Jahn of Champaign, Illinois and L. N. Cope of Decatur, Illinois at a cost of $115,000. Following the fire of January 1907, construction of the new building was under way by October, during the term of Governor Frank Hanly.  It was built primarily of stone, with stairs made of iron and marble. The county purchased two large brass cannons from the United States Government and placed them outside the building, where they still remain.

Notes

References

External links

Photographs of the Warren County Courthouse from the Ball State University Digital Media Repository

National Register of Historic Places in Warren County, Indiana
County courthouses in Indiana
Buildings and structures in Warren County, Indiana
Courthouses on the National Register of Historic Places in Indiana
1908 establishments in Indiana
Government buildings completed in 1908